SBS Broadcasting Group (SBS), formerly Scandinavian Broadcasting Systems, was a European multinational media group, operating commercial television, premium pay channels, radio stations and related print businesses in Northern, Western and Central and Eastern Europe. It became the second-largest broadcaster in Europe.

History
SBS was founded by Harry E. Sloan in 1989, who bought a stake in the Danish station Kanal 2 (a local station in Copenhagen, now Kanal 4) and Norwegian TVNorge. In 1991, Sloan bought the Swedish Nordic Channel, which was soon renamed Kanal 5 and became the third-largest commercial broadcaster in the country. The company was originally known as "TV1", but was renamed "Scandinavian Broadcasting Systems" in 1991. After expanding into Benelux and Eastern Europe, the name was changed again, this time to SBS. By July 1994, the time of the CC/ABC-Disney merger, Capital Cities/ABC owned 23% of SBS.

In March 2005, SBS acquired C More Entertainment, a Nordic pay tv provider operating under the Canal+ brand. In that year, SBS was bought by the equity firms Permira and Kohlberg Kravis Roberts (KKR). Telegraaf Media Groep of the Netherlands was also a shareholder in SBS, with a 20% equity interest. Permira and KKR also bought the German broadcaster ProSiebenSat.1 Media in early 2007, and on 27 June 2007 it was announced that ProSiebenSat.1 Media acquired the SBS Broadcasting group for 3.3 billion euros from the joint owners. ProSiebenSat.1 Media became the second-largest broadcaster of Europe with 48 TV stations.

Starting in 2011, ProSiebenSat.1 Media started to sell its non-German properties. The Dutch operations have been bought by Sanoma and Talpa Media Holding on 20 April 2011. In the end of 2011 ProSiebenSat.1 Group has sold its Bulgarian radio stations as well as the music channel the Voice TV to A.E. Best Success Services Bulgaria EOOD. The transaction was closed on 10 November 2011. On 14 December 2012, Discovery Communications bought the Nordic portion of SBS for $1.7 billion. The radio stations were later sold to Bauer Media Group. The Romanian TV and radio operations were bought by Romanian businessman Cristian Burci and Antenna Group in 2013.

Former operations 
This section lists former channels and publications until the company's acquisition in 2007.

Television 
Belgium
VT4 (now Play4)
VIJFtv (now Play5)
Bulgaria
The Voice (Bulgaria)
Denmark
Kanal 4
Kanal 5
SBS NET (now 6'eren)
The Voice TV Denmark (later 7'eren, now defunct)
Finland
Kutonen
TV5
Italy
 Rete Mia (defunct, joint ownership with Internova, Profit, and Videopiù, 1997–1999)
Hungary
TV2
Macedonia
Sitel
Sitel 2
Sitel 3
Kanal 5
Kanal 5 plus
Netherlands
SBS6
Net5
Veronica
SBS9
Kijk.nl (web only)
Norway
TVNorge
The Voice TV Norway (web only)
FEM
MAX
VOX
Romania
Prima TV (also broadcast by cable in Moldova)
Kiss TV (known as TV K Lumea before November 2006, now owned by Antenna Group)
Portugal
TVI (1996–1999)
Sweden
Kanal 5
Kanal 9
Kanal 11
The Voice TV Sweden (music, defunct)
Switzerland
 TV3 (Switzerland) (defunct, joint ownership with Tamedia, 1999–2001)

Radio stations 
Denmark
The Voice
POP FM 
NOVA FM
Greece
Lampsi 92.3 FM (now owned by Attica Editions)
Norway
Radio 1
The Voice
Radio Norge (previously known as Kanal 24)
Romania
Kiss FM (previously known as Radio Contact, available in Moldova with local insertions)
Magic FM
One FM
Rock FM
Sweden
Mix Megapol
Rockklassiker
The Voice
Radio 107.5
Vinyl 107

Print 
Veronica (TV/Radio guide)

References

External links 
 SBS Broadcasting Group
 SBS Radio
 Denmark
 Norway
 Sweden
 Greece

Pan-European media companies
Television in Denmark
Television channels and stations established in 1989
Private equity portfolio companies
Companies of Luxembourg
Former subsidiaries of The Walt Disney Company